Two Weeks with Love is a 1950 romantic musical film made by Metro-Goldwyn-Mayer. It was directed by Roy Rowland and based on story by John Larkin, who co-wrote the screenplay with Dorothy Kingsley.

Set in the early 20th century, the film focuses on the Robinson family. Patti (Jane Powell) and Melba (Debbie Reynolds), the daughters, are both accomplished in the performing arts, while the Robinson boys love fireworks and mischief. Mrs. Robinson (Ann Harding) is charming and very wise in the ways of young love. The Robinson family leaves their home in New York City to stay at "Kissimmee in the Catskills," a resort hotel in upstate New York, where love strikes both of the Robinson daughters.

Plot
The Robinson family is at the Stanley House Hotel, located in "Kissamee-in-the-Catskills", a resort town, for their annual two-week vacation. The resort owner's son, Billy, is enamored with Patti, who declines all of his invitations, considering him too young at 16 since she has just turned 17. Younger sister Melba is interested in Billy, but he is determined to chase after Patti.

Patti and her friend Valerie, a slightly older actress, compete for the attention of Demi, a handsome Cuban newly arrived at the resort. Valerie gives Patti poor advice on dealing with men and frequently points out that Patti is still a child.

Mr. Robinson overhears Billy and Patti complaining: Billy, because his father refuses to let him wear long pants, and Patti, because her mother refuses to let her wear a corset. Despite his wife's objections, Mr. Robinson buys a corset for Patti, inadvertently selecting a Surgical Corset (Back-brace corset) which has steel bone corsetry stays that lock up when the wearer bends too far.

At the variety show, Valerie convinces the resort owner to cut Patti from the show, but when Valerie cannot find her dancing shoes, she refuses to perform and Patti takes her place in a dance with Demi. During the dance, Patti's corset locks up and she is carried from the stage.

Mrs. Robinson releases Patti from the corset and promises to buy her a proper corset the next day. Demi receives permission from Patti's parents to call on her when they return to the city.

Cast
 Jane Powell as Patti Robinson
 Ricardo Montalbán as Demi Armendez (credited as Ricardo Montalban)
 Louis Calhern as Horatio Robinson
 Ann Harding as Katherine Robinson
 Phyllis Kirk as Valerie Stresemann
 Carleton Carpenter as Billy Finlay
 Debbie Reynolds as Melba Robinson
 Clinton Sundberg as Mr. Finlay
 Gary Gray as McCormick Robinson
 Tommy Rettig as Ricky Robinson
 Charles Smith as Eddie Gavin

Musical numbers

 "Aba Daba Honeymoon", music by Walter Donovan, lyrics by Arthur Fields, sung by Debbie Reynolds, Carleton Carpenter and others
 "The Oceana Roll", music by Lucien Denni, lyrics by Roger Lewis, sung by Jane Powell and others
 "A Heart That's Free", music by Alfred G. Robyn, lyrics by Thomas Railey, sung by Jane Powell
 "Row, Row, Row", music by James V. Monaco, lyrics by William Jerome, performed on-stage by Debbie Reynolds and Carleton Carpenter
 "Leichte Kavallerie Overture", lmusic by Franz von Suppé, played by the band in the park and when Valerie decides not to go on
 "That's How I Need You", music by Al Piantadosi, lyrics by Joseph McCarthy and Joe Goodwin, sung by Debbie Reynolds
 "By the Light of the Silvery Moon", music by Gus Edwards, lyrics by Edward Madden, sung by Louis Calhern, Ann Harding, Ricardo Montalbán, Phyllis Kirk, Jane Powell and chorus, in the lake scene
 "My Beautiful Lady", music by Ivan Caryll, lyrics by C.M.S. McLellan, sung by the chorus during Patti's dream sequence
 "My Hero", music by Oscar Straus, lyrics by Hugh Stanislaus Stange, performed by Jane Powell and Ricardo Montalbán during Patti's dream sequence
 "Sobre las olas" (uncredited), music by Juventino Rosas, played during Eddie's juggling act
 "Listen to the Mockingbird", music by Richard Milburn, lyrics by Septimus Winner, played when Demi is outside Patti's dressing room door
 "Destiny" (waltz), music by Sydney Baynes
 "A media luz" (tango), music by Edgardo Donatto, lyrics by Carlos Lenzi, danced by Jane Powell and Ricardo Montalbán

Reception
Estimates by Variety estimated the film would bring in $2,400,000 in distributor rentals, based on 1950 rentals (share of gross box office to the distributor) between its November 10 release and December 31 year end.  Final data, from MGM, records the film made them $1,695,000 in the US and Canada and $1,100,000 elsewhere, for a total of $2,795,000 in distributor rentals, resulting in a profit of $199,000.

When the 1914 song "Aba Daba Honeymoon" became a huge hit after the release of this film, MGM sent Debbie Reynolds and Carleton Carpenter on a multicity personal appearance tour of Loews theaters to capitalize on its success, beginning at the Oriental Theater in Chicago.

The film is recognized by American Film Institute in these lists:
 2004: AFI's 100 Years...100 Songs:	
 "Aba Daba Honeymoon" – Nominated

Soundtrack album

Two Weeks with Love, the soundtrack album to this film, was issued in a 10-inch LP format on MGM Records catalog E-530.  All tracks are backed by the M-G-M Studio Orchestra under the direction of Georgie Stoll.

Track listing

Side one
"A Heart That's Free" (Robyn - Railey) – performed by Jane Powell
"Row, Row, Row" (Monaco - Jerome) – performed by Debbie Reynolds and Carleton Carpenter
"Oceana Roll" (Denni - Lewis) – performed by Jane Powell

Side two
"By The Light Of The Silvery Moon" (Edwards - Madden) – performed by Jane Powell
"Aba Daba Honeymoon" (Donovan - Fields) – performed by Debbie Reynolds and Carleton Carpenter
"My Hero" (Straus - Stange) – performed by Jane Powell

Comic book adaption
 Eastern Color Movie Love #6 (December 1950)

References

External links

 
 
 
 

1950 films
1950 musical comedy films
1950 romantic comedy films
American musical comedy films
American romantic comedy films
American romantic musical films
Films directed by Roy Rowland
Films scored by Georgie Stoll
Films set in the 1900s
Metro-Goldwyn-Mayer films
Films set in New York (state)
Films set in hotels
Films adapted into comics
1950s English-language films
1950s American films